Matt Sayles (born February 21, 1994) is an American mixed martial artist who competes in the Featherweight division. A professional competitor since 2014, he has also competed with the  Ultimate Fighting Championship (UFC), Xplode MMA, World Series of Fighting and Cage Fury.

Mixed martial arts career

Amateur career
Matt Sayles began his mixed martial arts career as an amateur, competing with Xplode MMA. He made his debut aged 18, during XFS Amateur Series 1, when he faced fellow debutante Dominick Griffen. Sayles would go on to win in the second round by a rear naked choke.

His next fight was against Beau Hart for the vacant Xplode MMA Featherweight Championship, where he won the fight with a KO in the first round. His third and last amateur fight was a defense of the title, against Mike Willis, which he won by TKO.

Early career
Sayles made his professional debut with Xplode MMA in 2014, when he faced Chris Floyd. He won the fight by TKO in the first round.

Fighting with various promotions during the next three years, Sayles amassed a 6-1 record, culminating in an appearance on Dana White's Contender Series 10, where won by TKO against Yazan Hajeh, which earned him an UFC contract.

Ultimate Fighting Championship
Sayles made his UFC debut during UFC 227 when he fought Sheymon Moraes. Sayles would suffer multiple eye pokes during the fight, and ended up losing a controversial decision.

Sayles next faced Kyle Nelson on May 4, 2019, at UFC Fight Night 151.  He won the fight via submission via arm-triangle choke 3:16 into round 3.

Sayles faced Bryce Mitchell on December 7, 2019 at UFC on ESPN: Overeem vs. Rozenstruik. He lost the fight by submission from a twister in the first round.

Sayles faced Jordan Leavitt on December 18, 2021 at UFC Fight Night: Lewis vs. Daukaus. He lost the bout via inverted triangle choke in the second round.

On January 12, 2022, it was announced that Sayles's contract was not renewed.

Post UFC 
Sayles is scheduled to face Tyrek Malveaux on April 2, 2022 at XMMA 4.

Mixed martial arts record
 

|-
|Loss
|align=center|8–4
|Jordan Leavitt
|Submission (inverted triangle choke)
|UFC Fight Night: Lewis vs. Daukaus
|
|align=center|2
|align=center|2:05
|Las Vegas, Nevada, United States
|
|-
|Loss
|align=center|8–3
|Bryce Mitchell
|Submission (twister)
|UFC on ESPN: Overeem vs. Rozenstruik
|
|align=center|1
|align=center|4:20
|Washington D.C., United States
|
|-
|Win
|align=center|8–2
|Kyle Nelson
|Submission (arm-triangle choke)
|UFC Fight Night: Iaquinta vs. Cowboy
|
|align=center|3
|align=center|3:16
|Ottawa, Ontario, Canada
|
|-
|Loss
|align=center|7–2
|Sheymon Moraes
|Decision (unanimous)
|UFC 227
|
|align=center|3
|align=center|5:00
|Los Angeles, California, United States
|
|-
|Win
|align=center|7–1
|Yazan Hajeh
|TKO (punches)
|Dana White's Contender Series 10 
|
|align=center|1
|align=center|1:57
|Las Vegas, Nevada, United States
|
|-
|Win
|align=center|6–1
|Christian Aguilera
|TKO (punches)
|CFFC 64: Sayles vs. Aguilera
|
|align=center|1
|align=center|1:51
|San Diego, California, United States
|
|-
|Loss
|align=center|5–1
|George Hickman
|Decision (split)
|PFC 1
|
|align=center|3
|align=center|5:00
|Zouk Mikael, Lebanon
|
|-
|Win
|align=center|5–0
|Ryan Lang
|KO (punch)
|RFA 38: Moisés vs. Emmers
|
|align=center|1
|align=center|0:59
|Costa Mesa, California, United States
|
|-
|Win
|align=center|4–0
|DeMarcus Brown
|TKO (punches)
|Smash Global: The Main Event 3
|
|align=center|3
|align=center|4:12
|Los Angeles, California, United States
|
|-
|Win
|align=center|3–0
|Bryson Hansen
|Decision (unanimous)
|WSOF 12
|
|align=center|3
|align=center|5:00
|Las Vegas, Nevada, United States
|
|-
|Win
|align=center|2–0
|Dylan Stanfield
|TKO (punches)
|Xplode Fight Series: Fire
|
|align=center|1
|align=center|0:46
|Valley Center, California, United States
|
|-
|Win
|align=center|1–0
|Chris Floyd
|TKO (retirement)
|Xplode Fight Series: Aggression
|
|align=center|1
|align=center|1:15
|Valley Center, California, United States
|
|-
|}

Amateur mixed martial arts record

|-
|Win
|align=center| 3-0
|Mike Willis
|TKO (punches)
|Xplode Fight Series - Vengeance
|
|align=center|1
|align=center|1:50
|Valley Center, California, United States
|
|-
|Win
|align=center| 2-0
|Beau Hart
|KO (punch)
|Xplode Fight Series - Eclipse
|
|align=center|1
|align=center|0:36
|Valley Center, California, United States
|
|-
|Win
|align=center| 1-0
|Dominick Griffen
|Submission (rear-naked choke)
|Xplode Amateur Fight Series - XAFS 1: Revolution
|
|align=center|2
|align=center|2:32
|Valley Center, California, United States
|
|-
|}

External links

References 

1994 births
American male mixed martial artists
Mixed martial artists from California
People from Chula Vista, California
Featherweight mixed martial artists
Mixed martial artists utilizing wrestling
Ultimate Fighting Championship male fighters
Living people